Giéville is a former commune in the Manche department in north-western France. On 1 January 2016, it was merged into the new commune of Torigny-les-Villes. The commune has a population of 679 people (2019).

See also
Communes of the Manche department

References 

Former communes of Manche